Da-hee is a Korean feminine given name. Its meaning differs based on the hanja used to write each syllable of the name. There are seven hanja with the reading "da" and 24 hanja with the reading "hee" on the South Korean government's official list of hanja which may be registered for use in given names.

People with this name include:
Lee Da-hee (born 1985), South Korean actress

See also
List of Korean given names

References

Korean feminine given names